El Mirador Azul (Puerto Rico, 1957) was the only self-proclaimed surrealist group in Puerto Rico. The group included student artists and poets under the guidance of Spanish surrealist Eugenio F. Granell during his tenure (approximately 1950–1958, depending on source) at the University of Puerto Rico in Rio Piedras.

Origins
The group of university students - artists and poets - who would come to make up El Mirador Azul (The Blue Lookout) was meeting informally in a makeshift classroom in the basement of the University of Puerto Rico's main administrative building's tower, where Granell's studio space was located, before the group was known by that name. The Blue Lookout refers to the space the group rented in 1957 located at #34 Calle Aibonito in Hato Rey. (An announcement for the group's 1957 exhibit in Artes y Letras locates the rented space on Calle Arecibo in Hato Rey.) It was a small apartment painted blue with a balcony, the width of the apartment, over the garage of a house. It was within walking distance to the university campus. Eventually, the students began referring to their meeting place as "el mirador" and "el mirador azul." After the group could no longer afford to rent the mirador azul, gatherings were convened at different members' houses but slowly dissipated after members graduated, moved away, and began their careers.

The Mirador Azul firmly establishes Surrealism as a movement in Puerto Rico, and, though the official group was short-lived, a number of its members continued with their artistic endeavors, both privately and publicly. Recent scholarship and exhibits have renewed public interest in the  Mirador Azul, its members, and Granell's surrealist influence on the island's literary and artistic sensibilities of the time.

Members
 Roberto "Boquio" Alberty  (Guggenheim Fellowship Recipient)
 Juan Cossio 
 Frances Del Valle
 Myrna Espada
 Rafael Ferrer [A student of Granell, friend of members of the Mirador Azul, but not a member of the group]
 Nydianna Font
 Gustavo López [Granell's student in the early 1950s who was a friend of Lima and Maysonet, but not a member of the Mirador Azul group]
 Jorge "Lopito" López
 Octavia "Tavin" Maldonado
 José María Lima
 Luis Maysonet Crespo
 Miguel Ángel Rios
 Julio Rosado Del Valle [Established artist who was highly respected by the group, a friend and mentor]
 Ernesto Jaime Ruíz de la Mata
 Víctor Sánchez

Exhibitions
 (1951) Exposición de la sesión de verano de 1951, Departamento de Bellas Artes, U.P.R. Contributing Artists include: Eugenio Fernádez Granell, Rubén Bras, Hilton Cummings, Pedro Gispert, Gloria Gómez, Félix López, Luis Maisonet (sic), Ethel Ríos, Luz Santos, and Cossette Zeno. (Artist names are in the order in which they were originally listed in the El Mundo announcement.)
 (1956) "16 Pintores Van a Exponer en UPR" sponsored by the UPR Departamento de Humanidades. Contributing artists included: L. M. Maysonet, J. Rosado del Valle, J. Ruiz de la Matta (sic), Víctor Sánchez, Nieves Serrano, J. L. Soya, Virginia Vidich, Cossette Zeno, Otto Néstor Bravo, Gustavo López, Roberto Alberty, Carlos Crespo, Frances del Valle, Rafael Ferrer, E. F. Granell, and José Lima. (Artist names are in the order in which they were originally listed in the El Mundo announcement.)
 (1956) "Inauguran Hoy Exposición UPR". This announcement lists the following artists: Roberto Alberty, Otto Néstor Bravo, Carlos Crespo, Frances del Valle, Rafael Ferrer, Jorge Luis García [not listed on March 1, 1956, announcement], E. F. Granell, José Lima, Gustavo López Muňoz, L. A. Maisonet, Julio Rosado del Valle, J. Ruiz de la Mata, Víctor Sánchez, Nieves Serrano, J. L. Solla, Virginia Vidich y Cossette Zeno. (Artist names are in the order in which they were originally listed in the El Mundo announcement.)
 (1957) Exposición de Pintura Surrealista y Moderna held at El Mirador Azul on Calle Arecibo, Hato Rey. Contributing artists included: Frank A. Cepeda, R. Alberty, F. del Valle, J. Jolquera, L. A. Maisonet (sic), Lima Franell, G. L. Muñiz, Tavin, Ana. (Artist names are in the order in which they were originally listed in the Artes y Letras "Noticias Culturales" section.) 
 (1960) Abstracciones, Solo exhibition by Ruiz de la Mata, February 19 to March 8, Museo de la Universidad, Rio Piedras, Puerto Rico.
 (1961) "Ferrer y Villamil Exponen en UPR," exposition of works by Rafael Ferrer and Rafael Villamil held at the Museo UPR.
 (1963) Exposición de Pinturas, Frances Del Valle's first solo exposition held at the Museo UPR.
 (2014) Camino al Mirador Azul, a retrospective exhibition organized by José Correa Vigier, February 6 to March 14, 2014, Galeria de Art de la Universidad del Sagrado Corazon.
 (2017) Volando chiringa, exhibition by Frances del Valle, July 20 to September 24, 2017, Fundación Eugenio Granell, Santiago de Compostela, Spain.

References

American artist groups and collectives
Surrealist groups
Surrealism